America's Castles  is a documentary television series that aired on A&E Network from 1994 to 2005. Through interviews, historic photos and newly shot footage, the program documents the mansions and summer homes of the high society of The Gilded Age. The series is narrated by Joe van Riper and many episodes feature architectural expert Richard Guy Wilson.

Featured homes

Agecroft Hall
Belcourt Castle
Biltmore Estate
Bishop's Palace (Galveston, Texas)
The Breakers
Cà d'Zan
Camp Pine Knot
Camp Uncas
Castillo Serralles (in 1996)   
Casa Loma
Chapultepec Castle
Château-sur-Mer
Eagle's Nest
The Elms
Evergreen House
Fair Lane
Filoli
Fonthill Castle
Frank Lloyd Wright Home and Studio
Glensheen Mansion
Great Camp Sagamore
Hearst Castle
Hempstead House/Falaise
Hillwood Estate, Museum & Gardens
Kykuit
Longwood
Longue Vue in New Orleans (Cotton Kings episode)
Lyndhurst
Mar-a-Lago
Marble House
Meadow Brook Hall
Nottoway Plantation
Oak Alley Plantation/Bon Sejour
Old Westbury Gardens
Parkwood Estate (Samuel McLaughlin home, Oshawa)
Ralston Hall
Rosalie Plantation
Rosecliff
Rosemount Museum
Sagamore Hill
Salisbury House
Scotty's Castle
Springwood Estate
Stan Hywet Hall
Stanton Hall
Taliesin
Taliesin West
Vanderbilt Mansion
Villa Vizcaya
Virginia House
Whitehall
The Winchester Mystery House

References 

A&E (TV network) original programming
1994 American television series debuts
English-language television shows
1990s American documentary television series
2005 American television series endings